Eyralpenus trifasciata is a moth of the family Erebidae. It was described by William Jacob Holland in 1892. It is found in Tanzania.

References

External links
 

Endemic fauna of Tanzania
Spilosomina
Moths described in 1892